Little Miss Smiles is a 1922 American drama film directed by John Ford. The film is considered to be lost.

Plot
As described in a film magazine, The Jewish Aaronson family consists of Papa (Williams), Mama (Franklin), David (Rankin), Louis (Testa), Leon (Lapan), Esther (Mason), and the Baby (Blumfield). They live in humble quarters in the ghetto of a large city. Esther spreads sunshine with her smiles and, when Mama is stricken blind and taken to the hospital, she assumes the duties as head of the family. Doctor Jack Washton (Glass) at the hospital takes an interest in Esther and saves her from The Spider (D'Albrook) when he invades the Aaronson flat. On the day Mama is brought home, David is arrested for shooting The Spider. The doctor, in order to shield Esther's mother from the pain of seeing her boy arrested, assumes the blame for the shooting. The Spider, however, recovers and absolves David from all blame.

Cast
 Shirley Mason as Esther Aaronson
 Gaston Glass as Dr. Jack Washton
 George B. Williams as Papa Aaronson (credited as George Williams)
 Martha Franklin as Mama Aaronson
 Arthur Rankin as Davie Aaronson
 Alfred Testa as Louis Aaronson
 Richard Lapan as Leon Aaronson
 Sidney D'Albrook as 'The Spider'
 Baby Blumfield as Baby Aaronson

See also
List of lost films

References

External links

1922 films
1922 drama films
1922 lost films
Silent American drama films
American silent feature films
American black-and-white films
Films directed by John Ford
Fox Film films
Lost American films
Films with screenplays by Dorothy Yost
Lost drama films
1920s American films